Kazi Nazrul Islam Airport  is a domestic airport serving the cities of Durgapur and Asansol. It is located at Andal, Paschim Bardhaman in the state of West Bengal, India. It is named after the renowned Bengali poet, Kazi Nazrul Islam.

The airport's hinterland comprises the towns of Bardhaman, Bankura, Bishnupur, Purulia, Sainthia, Suri, Bolpur, Rampurhat in West Bengal and Dhanbad and Bokaro in Jharkhand. It is part of the country's first private sector Aerotropolis, being developed by Bengal Aerotropolis Projects Limited (BAPL). The airport was officially inaugurated on 19 September 2013 by the Chief Minister of West Bengal, Mamata Banerjee. According to 2018-19 data, Kazi Nazrul Islam Airport is the 3rd busiest airport of West Bengal and the 61st busiest airport of India.

History

Construction planning 
The project was conceived in 2006–07 during the Left Front government. The construction of the airport was completed on 2013. But for several reasons, the airport did not receive final operational clearance from the aviation regulator DGCA until 24 April 2015. Regular Commercial Flights started from 2015.

Commencement of the airport 
On 10 May 2015, Prime Minister Narendra Modi became the first passenger to use the new airport when he flew out to Delhi, aboard an Indian Air Force Boeing 737 VIP aircraft, even before commercial airlines started their regular service from the airport. Scheduled commercial operation commenced on 18 May 2015. Another airline, Zoom Air, also begun flights on the Delhi – Durgapur – Kolkata route but after three months the flight was stopped due to lack of passengers. The airport gained popularity in 2018 with connections to Delhi and Hyderabad by Air India and to  Mumbai and Chennai in October 2019 by SpiceJet.

Plan 
The airport has 70% open green space for facilitating fresh green environment within the airport area.

Ownership 
The State Government also has a 26.05% stake through West Bengal Industrial Development Corporation. Singapore's Changi Airports International (CAI) has a 30.21% stake in BAPL. Other Indian promoters include IL&FS, Pragati Social Infrastructure & Development, Pragati 47, Lend Lease Company India and Citystar Infrastructure.

Infrastructure

Terminal 
The 5,750 square metre passenger terminal building first started with 1 million passengers per annum capacity 2015, and with expansions as per 2022 it can now handle up to 2.5 million passengers per annum. It has six check-in counters with Common Use Terminal equipment (CUTE) in the departure lounge and two baggage conveyor belts at the arrival hall. The airport is equipped with category VI firefighting and rescue capability.

Runway 

The airport's 2,800-meter runway (which is expandable up to 3,315-metre) is equipped with a CAT I instrument landing system (ILS) and can handle narrow-body aircraft like Airbus A320 and Boeing 737. The airport apron has four parking bays and a Helipad.

Airlines and destinations 
This airport had flights connecting Kolkata to Durgapur to and forth.  Alliance Air was the first airline to operate with an ATR 42 having a seating capacity of 48 people. Except for Friday, the flights operated daily. However, due to the unavailability of passengers, the service was discontinued on 17 June 2016.

As of February 2023, the following destinations are connected to Durgapur :

Connectivity

Roads
The airport is conveniently connected to Durgapur and Asansol through National Highway 19. There are dedicated transport options available to reach the airport and reach passengers’ desired destinations from the airport.

Railway 

Statistics

Busiest routes

Accidents and Incidents
• On 1 May 2022, a SpiceJet Boeing 737–800 aircraft VT-SLH operating from Mumbai to Durgapur as SG-945, encountered a severe turbulence while descending at Durgapur, injuring 14 passengers and 3 flight attendants out of 195 occupants (including two pilots and four flight attendants). A passenger, Akbar Ansari (48), died of a spinal injury five months later.

See also
 Burnpur Airport
 Netaji Subhash Chandra Bose International Airport
 Bagdogra Airport
 Airports in India
 List of airports in West Bengal
 List of busiest airports in India by passenger traffic
Deoghar Airport

References 

Airports in West Bengal
Kazi Nazrul Islam
Transport in Asansol
Transport in Durgapur
2013 establishments in West Bengal
Airports established in 2013